The Marshall Islands has competed in four summer Olympiads. It has yet to compete at a Winter Olympic Games. The Marshall Islands Olympic debut was at the 2008 Summer Olympics in Beijing, China. The highest number of Marshallese athletes participating in a Summer Games is five in the 2008 games in Beijing. No athlete from the Marshall Islands has ever won a medal at the Olympics.

Olympic overview

Pre-Olympics 
During the era of the modern Olympic Games the country was controlled at various times by Japan, Germany, and the United States until it gained its sovereignty. The sovereign government of the Marshall Islands was established in 1979. In 1986, the Compact of Free Association with the United States entered into force, granting the Republic of the Marshall Islands its sovereignty. The island nation is made up of twenty-nine atolls and five lone islands.  The Marshall Islands National Olympic Committee was created in 2001, and gained recognition by the International Olympic Committee at their meeting in 2006. The Marshall Islands National Olympic Committee brought the total number of NOC's to 203 at the time of their admittance.

2008 Summer Olympics 

The Marshall Islands debuted at the 2008 Summer Olympic in Beijing, China, with five athletes competing in three sports. Roman William Cress and Haley Nemra represented the nation in the track and field events. Jared Heine and Julianne Kirchner competed in the swimming events. Anju Jason, who competed in taekwondo at the Games, is the only Marshallese athlete to have competed in taekwondo at the Olympics as of the 2016 Summer Olympics.

2012 Summer Olympics 

The Marshall Islands sent four athletes to the 2012 Summer Olympics in London. Timi Garstang and Haley Nemra competed in the track and field events and Giordan Harris and Ann-Marie Hepler represented the nation in swimming at the Games. Before competing in the 2012 Summer Games, the Marshallese delegation attended a training camp in Australia for a month.

2016 Summer Olympics 

Five athletes from the Marshall Islands took part in the 2016 Summer Olympics in Rio de Janeiro, Brazil. Richson Simeon and Mariana Cress represented the nation in the track and field events. Giordan Harris and Colleen Furgeson competed in the swimming events. Mathlynn Sasser, who took part in weightlifting at the Games, was the first (and, as of the 2016 Games, only) Marshallese athlete to compete in weightlifting at the Olympics.

Medal tables

Medals by Summer Games

Flagbearers

See also
 List of participating nations at the Summer Olympic Games
 List of participating nations at the Winter Olympic Games

References

External links